General Babka is a 1930 Austrian film directed by Dezső Kertész and starring Wolf Albach-Retty, Angelo Ferrari, and Mary Kid.

Cast
In alphabetical order

References

Bibliography

External links 
 

1930 films
1930s German-language films
Austrian black-and-white films
Films directed by Dezső Kertész